The 2014–15 Cypriot First Division was the 76th season of the Cypriot top-level football league. It began on 23 August 2014 and ended on 24 May 2015. APOEL were the defending champions.

The league reduced from 14 to 12 teams this season, comprised ten teams from the 2013–14 season and two promoted teams from the 2013–14 B1 Division. APOEL won the league for a 24th time and a third time in a row, after amassing 62 points.

Teams

Promotion and relegation (pre-season)
Enosis Neon Paralimni and Alki Larnaca were relegated at the end of the first stage of the 2013–14 season after finishing in the bottom two places of the table. They were joined by Aris Limassol and AEK Kouklia, who finished at the bottom of the second-phase relegation group.

The relegated teams were replaced by 2013–14 B1 Division champions Ayia Napa and runners-up Othellos Athienou.

Stadia and locations

Note: Table lists clubs in alphabetical order.

Personnel and kits
Note: Flags indicate national team as has been defined under FIFA eligibility rules. Players and Managers may hold more than one non-FIFA nationality.

Managerial changes

First phase

League table

Results

Second phase

Championship group

Table

Results

Relegation group

Table

Results

Season statistics

Top scorers
Including matches played on 24 May 2015; Source: Cyprus Football Association

Hat-tricks

Scoring
First goal of the season: 54 minutes and 31 seconds –  Luis Morán (Ermis) against Doxa (18:09 EET, 23 August 2014)
Fastest goal of the season: 42 seconds –  Juninho (Ethnikos) against AEL (22 March 2015)
Latest goal of the season: 99 minutes and 6 seconds –  Marcos De Azevedo (Ermis) against Doxa (7 December 2014)
First scored penalty kick of the season: 62 minutes and 20 seconds –  Joan Tomàs (AEK) against Apollon (20:17 EET, 24 August 2014)
First own goal of the season: 5 minutes and 1 seconds –  Stavros Stathakis (Ayia Napa) for Anorthosis (20:05 EET, 27 September 2014)
Most goals scored in a match by one player: 3 goals
 Ricardo Lobo (Doxa) against AEL (26 April 2015)
Most scored goals in a single fixture – 28 goals (Fixture 31)
Fixture 31 results: Othellos 3–0 AEL, Ethnikos 3–2 Ayia Napa, Nea Salamina 6–0 Doxa, Anorthosis 3–1 Apollon, APOEL 1–1 AEK, Omonia 7–1 Ermis.
 Highest scoring game: 8 goals
APOEL 4–4 AEK (15 December 2014)
Omonia 7–1 Ermis (17 May 2015)
 Largest winning margin: 6 goals
Nea Salamina 6–0 Doxa (16 May 2015)
Omonia 7–1 Ermis (17 May 2015)
 Most goals scored in a match by a single team: 7 goals
Omonia 7–1 Ermis (17 May 2015)
 Most goals scored by a losing team: 2 goals
Apollon 2–5 AEK (24 August 2014)
Omonia 3–2 Anorthosis (1 September 2014)
AEL 2–3 Ermis (2 November 2014)
Nea Salamina 2–3 Anorthosis (3 November 2014)
Ethnikos 4–2 AEL (14 December 2014)
Apollon 3–2 Ermis (15 December 2014)
Ayia Napa 2–5 Apollon (15 December 2014)
Omonia 4–2 Doxa (1 February 2015)
APOEL 3–2 Omonia (2 May 2015)
Ethnikos 3–2 Ayia Napa (16 May 2015)
Ermis 2–4 APOEL (24 May 2015)

Discipline
 First yellow card of the season: 44 minutes –  Paulo Pina for Ermis against Doxa (17:44 EET, 23 August 2014)
 First red card of the season: 50 minutes –  Milan Stepanov for Omonia against Nea Salamina (21:05 EET, 14 September 2014)
 Most yellow cards in a single match: 14
 Apollon 3–3 AEL – 7 for Apollon (Gastón Sangoy (2), Luka Stojanović (2), Dustley Mulder, Jan Rezek, Giorgos Merkis) and 7 for AEL (Luciano Bebê (2), Valentinos Sielis, Calo, Diallo Guidileye, Georgios Eleftheriou, Andreas Stavrou) (4 January 2015)
 Most red cards in a single match: 3
 Apollon 3–3 AEL – 2 for Apollon (Gastón Sangoy, Luka Stojanović) and 1 for AEL (Luciano Bebê) (4 January 2015)

References

Sources

Cypriot First Division seasons
Cyprus
1